Dongfangzhimen Station (literally Gate to the East Station) is a station of Line 1 and Line 3 of Suzhou Rail Transit. The station is located in Suzhou Industrial Park of Suzhou, near the Gate to the East skyscraper, which is positioned at the intersection of the historical East-West-axis of Suzhou Old Town with the West bank of Jinji Lake. The station has been in use since April 28, 2012, the same time of the preoperation of Line 1.

Gallery

References

Railway stations in Jiangsu
Suzhou Industrial Park
Suzhou Rail Transit stations
Railway stations in China opened in 2012